Guldspaden   is an annual Swedish journalism award for investigative journalism.

Dating from 1991, it is awarded by the  non-profit organization Föreningen Grävande Journalister (Swedish Association of Investigative Journalism which is part of Global Investigative Journalism Network).

Prizes are awarded to  the country’s best investigative reporters.

The prize includes a spade statue in bronze  designed and created by sculptor and artist  Mats Lodén.

References

External links
Föreningen Grävande Journalister website
Journalism awards
Swedish awards